Ferrate(VI) is the inorganic anion with the chemical formula [FeO4]2−. It is photosensitive, contributes a pale violet colour to compounds and solutions containing it and is one of the strongest water-stable oxidizing species known. Although it is classified as a weak base, concentrated solutions containing ferrate(VI) are corrosive and attack the skin and are only stable at high pH.

Nomenclature 

The term ferrate is normally used to mean ferrate(VI), although it can refer to other iron-containing anions, many of which are more commonly encountered than salts of [FeO4]2−.  These include the highly reduced species disodium tetracarbonylferrate ,  and salts of the iron(III) complex tetrachloroferrate [FeCl4]− in 1-Butyl-3-methylimidazolium tetrachloroferrate.  Although rarely studied, ferrate(V) [FeO4]3− and ferrate(IV) [FeO4]4− oxyanions of iron also exist.  These too are called ferrates.

Synthesis

Ferrate(VI) salts are formed by oxidizing iron in an aqueous medium with strong oxidizing agents under alkaline conditions, or in the solid state by heating a mixture of iron filings and powdered potassium nitrate.

For example, ferrates are produced by heating iron(III) hydroxide with sodium hypochlorite in alkaline solution:

2  + 3  + 4  → 2  + 5  + 3 

The anion is typically precipitated as the barium(II) salt, forming barium ferrate.

Properties

Fe(VI) is a strong oxidizing agent over the entire pH range, with a reduction potential (Fe(VI)/Fe(III) couple) varying from +2.2 V to +0.7 V versus SHE in acidic and basic media respectively.

 + 8  + 3 e−   + 4 ; E0 = +2.20 V (acidic medium)
 + 4  + 3 e−   + 5 ; E0 = +0.72 V (basic medium)

Because of this, the ferrate(VI) anion is unstable at neutral or acidic pH values, decomposing to iron(III): The reduction goes through intermediate species in which iron has oxidation states +5 and +4. These anions are even more reactive than ferrate(VI). In alkaline conditions ferrates are more stable, lasting for about 8 to 9 hours at pH 8 or 9.

Aqueous solutions of ferrates are pink when dilute, and deep red or purple at higher concentrations. The ferrate ion is a stronger oxidizing agent than permanganate, and oxidizes ammonia to molecular nitrogen.

The ferrate(VI) ion has two unpaired electrons and is thus paramagnetic. It has a tetrahedral molecular geometry, isostructural with the chromate and permanganate ions.

Applications 
Ferrates are excellent disinfectants, and are capable of removing and destroying viruses. They are also of interest as potential as an environmentally friendly water treatment chemical, as the byproduct of ferrate oxidation is the relatively benign iron(III).

Sodium ferrate is a useful reagent with good selectivity and is stable in aqueous solution of high pH, remaining soluble in an aqueous solution saturated with sodium hydroxide.

See also
 High-valent iron
 Potassium ferrate
 Barium ferrate

References

 
Oxidizing agents
Transition metal oxyanions
Oxometallates